"Rain Over Me" is a song by Cuban-American rapper Pitbull from his sixth studio album, Planet Pit. It features vocals from Puerto Rican-American singer Marc Anthony. The song was written by Pitbull, RedOne, Marc Anthony, Bilal "The Chef" Hajji, AJ Janussi and Rachid "Rush" Aziz. It was also produced by RedOne, Rush and Jimmy Joker. It was released on June 10, 2011, as the third promotional single from the album and received a full release as the album's third official single on June 8, 2011.

It charted at number 30 on the US Billboard Hot 100. The song also became Pitbull's second number one single on the Billboard Hot Latin Songs chart as well his first number-one single on the Tropical Songs. In addition, it is Marc Anthony's sixth number-one single on the Hot Latin Songs and twentieth number-one single on the Tropical Songs, reclaiming his position as having the artist with the most number-one Tropical Songs chart after a two-year tie with Víctor Manuelle. The music video was directed by David Rosseau, who also directed a previous Pitbull single, "I Know You Want Me (Calle Ocho)" in 2009. The song is featured on the dance rhythm game, Just Dance 2020.

Background and composition 
"Rain Over Me" is a dance song produced by RedOne, David Rush and Jimmy Joker. It contains dramatic "disco-rave" synths. According to Robert Copsey of Digital Spy the song is "a step outside his [Pitbull's] usual robotic sound. Bill Lamb of About.com noted that both Pitbull and Marc Anthony are of Latin Caribbean descent, referring to the song as a "superstar Latin Caribbean duet".

Music video 
The music video was released onto Pitbull's official Vevo channel on July 22, 2011. The video was directed by David Rousseau. It features both Pitbull and Marc Anthony in the desert along with actress Natalie Martinez, with many water effects.

On April 13, 2020, the video surpassed the 1 billion views mark, thus making it in the first 200 YouTube videos to reach this milestone. This is the third and second video to accomplish this feat for Pitbull and Marc Anthony in that order respectively.

Track listing 
Digital download
"Rain Over Me"  – 3:51

German maxi CD single
"Rain Over Me" (Album Version) 

Other remixes
"Rain Over Me" (Benny Benassi Remix) – 5:16
"Rain Over Me" (Jorge Duran Remix) – 2:53
"Rain Over Me" (Laidback Luke Remix) — 6:15

Credits and personnel 
Pitbull – songwriter, vocals
RedOne – songwriter, producer, instruments, programming and vocal editing
Marc Anthony – songwriter, lead vocals and backing vocals
Bilal "The Chef" Hajji – songwriter
AJ Janussi – songwriter, vocal editing and recording
Rachid "Rush" Aziz – songwriter producer, instruments and programming
Jimmy Joker – producer, instruments and programming
Trevor Muzzy – vocal editing, recording and mixing
Al Burna – Pitbull vocal recording
Tom Coyne – mastering

Credits adapted from Planet Pit album liner notes.

Charts

Weekly Charts

Year-end charts

All-time charts

Certifications

Release history

See also 
List of number-one Billboard Top Latin Songs of 2011
List of number-one Billboard Hot Tropical Songs of 2011
List of Romanian Top 100 number ones of the 2010s

References

External links 

2011 singles
2011 songs
Pitbull (rapper) songs
Marc Anthony songs
Eurodance songs
Number-one singles in Romania
Number-one singles in Spain
Song recordings produced by RedOne
Songs written by Pitbull (rapper)
Songs written by RedOne
Songs written by Marc Anthony
Songs written by Bilal Hajji
Dance-pop songs
Songs written by AJ Junior